Rachel Hayward (born August 7, 1968) is a Canadian actress. She began pursuing a serious acting career in her early twenties.  As a child and teen, Hayward was involved in modeling and commercials but always thought she would become a doctor. She graduated from the Ontario College of Art and Design, having studied graphic design and fine arts. From there she freelanced as a designer and simultaneously began working in acting.

Hayward's feature film and TV movie credits include Stranger in the Mirror, Under the Gun, Breaking All the Rules, Deadfire, She Woke Up Pregnant, Convergence, Knight Moves and the romantic comedy Apartment Hunting.

In television she has starred as Florence in Chris Carter's series Harsh Realm and had a recurring role in Jake 2.0.  She is remembered by many science fiction fans as the USAF Sergeant who is abducted by Apophis in the opening moments of the Stargate SG-1 pilot.  She has also appeared in Andromeda, Bliss, Cold Squad, First Wave, Highlander: The Series, Millennium, Mutant X, Sliders, The Dead Zone, The L Word, Tru Calling, Viper, Welcome to Paradox and Xena: Warrior Princess.

Hayward is single and resides in Vancouver, British Columbia, Canada.

Filmography

References

External links
 

Canadian film actresses
Canadian television actresses
Living people
OCAD University alumni
20th-century Canadian actresses
21st-century Canadian actresses
1968 births